This article will display the squads for the 2013 UEFA European Under-19 Championship.
Only players born on or after 1 January 1994 are eligible to play.

Every team had to submit a list of 18 players. Two of them must be goalkeepers.

Age, caps and goals are as of the start of the tournament, July 20, 2013.

Group A

Head coach: Antanas Vingilys

Head coach: Wim van Zwam

Head coach: Luis de la Fuente

Head coach: Emílio Peixe

Emílio Peixe named his final 18-man squad on 5 July 2013. On 14 July, Rui Silva replaced José Costa.

Group B

Head coach: Ljubinko Drulović

Head coach: Okan Buruk

Head coach: Giorgi Tsetsadze

Head coach: Francis Smerecki

Player representation

By club

By club nationality 
 
Nations in italics are not represented by their national teams in the finals.

References

External links
Official website

Squads
UEFA European Under-19 Championship squads